Tavurvur is an active stratovolcano near Rabaul, on the island of New Britain, in Papua New Guinea. It is a sub-vent of the Rabaul caldera and lies on the eastern rim of the larger feature. An eruption of the volcano largely destroyed the nearby town of Rabaul in 1994.

Mount Tavurvur is the most active volcano in Rabaul caldera, and erupted most recently on 29 August 2014.

The correct pronunciation of the volcano's name is tah-VOOR-voor, according to the Rabaul Volcanological Observatory.

History

Gallery

References

External links 

 Volcano World: Tavurvur, Rabaul Caldera
 , the August 29th, 2014 eruption of Tavurvur captured by Phil McNamara.

Stratovolcanoes of Papua New Guinea
Subduction volcanoes
Volcanoes of New Britain
East New Britain Province
Active volcanoes
1937 natural disasters
2014 natural disasters